Thetidia is a genus of moths in the family Geometridae.

Species
Thetidia albocostaria (Bremer, 1864)
Thetidia albosagittata (Ebert, 1965)
Thetidia atyche (Prout, 1935)
Thetidia bilineata Hausmann, 1991
Thetidia chlorophyllaria (Hedemann, 1879)
Thetidia correspondens (Alpheraky, 1883)
Thetidia crucigerata (Christoph, 1887)
Thetidia euryrithra (Prout, 1935)
Thetidia fulminaria (Lederer, 1871)
Thetidia hammeri (Ebert, 1965)
Thetidia hazara (Ebert, 1965)
Thetidia kansuensis (Djakonov, 1936)
Thetidia mabillei (Thierry-Mieg, 1893)
Thetidia pallidmarginata (Pajni & Walia, 1984)
Thetidia persica Hausmann, 1996
Thetidia plusiaria Boisduval, 1840
Thetidia radiata Walker, 1863
Thetidia recta (Brandt, 1941)
Thetidia sardinica (Schawerda, 1934)
Thetidia serraria (Staudinger, 1892)
Thetidia silvia Hausmann, 1991
Thetidia smaragdaria (Fabricius, 1787)
Thetidia smaragdularia (Staudinger, 1892)
Thetidia undulilinea (Warren, 1905)
Thetidia volgaria (Guenee, 1858)

References

External links
Natural History Museum Lepidoptera genus database

Comibaenini
Geometridae genera